Igli may refer to:

Places
 Igli, Algeria, a town and commune
 Igli, Morocco, a small town and rural commune

People
 Igli Allmuça (born 1980), Albanian footballer
 Igli Cara, Albanian politician
 Igli Tare (born 1973), Albanian former footballer